Arseny Mikhailovich Avraamov (born Krasnokutsky [Краснокутский], 1886 died Moscow, 1944) was an avant-garde Russian composer and theorist. He studied at the music school of the Moscow Philharmonic Society, with private composition lessons from Sergey Taneyev. He refused to fight in World War I, and fled the country to work, among other things, as a circus artist. Returning in 1917, he went on to compose his famous "Simfoniya gudkov" and was a pioneer in Russian sound on film techniques. Among his other achievements were the invention of graphic-sonic art, produced by drawing directly onto the optical sound track of film, and an "Ultrachromatic" 48-tone microtonal system, presented in his thesis, "The Universal System of Tones," in Berlin, Frankfurt, and Stuttgart in 1927. His microtonal system predated the creation of the Petrograd Society for Quarter-Tone Music in 1923, by Georgii Rimskii-Korsakov.

Today, his most famous work is Simfoniya gudkov (Гудковая симфония, "Symphony of factory sirens"). This piece involved navy ship sirens and whistles, bus and car horns, factory sirens, cannons, the foghorns of the entire Soviet flotilla in the Caspian Sea, artillery guns, machine guns, hydro-airplanes, a specially designed "whistle main," and renderings of Internationale, Warszawianka and Marseillaise by a mass band and choir. The piece was conducted by a team of conductors using flags and pistols. It was performed in the city of Baku in 1922, celebrating the fifth anniversary of the 1917 October Revolution, and less successfully in Moscow, a year later.

Sources
Edmunds, Neil, ed. Soviet Music and Society Under Lenin and Stalin. London: Routledge Curzon, 2004.
Lobanova, Marina. “Avraamov, Arseny Mikhaylovich.” Grove Music Online ed. L Macy (Accessed 10 June 2008), http://www.grovemusic.com.
Sitsky, Larry. Music of the Repressed Russian Avant-Garde, 1900-1929. London: Greenwood Press, 1994.

External links 
 
description of Avraamov's Baku concert with program notes
 Арсений Авраамов biography at theremin.ru
A link mentioning his contribution to the Tonewheel
"Nonlinear History" presentation by Andrey Smirnov, contains slides on Avraamov's Symfony of Factory Sirens
 http://www.rermegacorp.com/mm5/merchant.mvc?Screen=PROD&Product_Code=ReRRAG12&Category_Code=RL&Store_Code=RM

Russian composers
Russian male composers
1886 births
1944 deaths
Graphical sound
20th-century Russian male musicians